The following is a list of musicians who have been members of Romanian rock and roll band Transsylvania Phoenix since their formation in Timișoara in 1962. The current lineup consists of founder Nicu Covaci and five other members.

Current lineup
Nicu Covaci
Active: 1962–present 
Instruments: guitars, vocals
Release contributions: all releases

Florin "Moni" Bordeianu
Active: 1962–1970, 1977–1979, 2014–present
Instruments: lead vocals, drums
Release contributions: Vremuri, Totuși sunt ca voi

Adam Costin
Active: 2014–present
Instruments: vocals
Release contributions: Vino, Țepeș

Dzidek Marcinkiewicz
Active: 1983, 1985–1999, 2008–present
Instruments: keyboards, bass guitar, backing vocals
Release contributions: Vino, Țepeș

Volker Vaessen
Active: 1992–1993, 1999–2000, 2002–2005, 2008–present
Instruments: bass guitar
Release contributions: SymPhoenix, In Umbra Marelui Urs, Vino, Țepeș

Flavius Hosu
Active: 2014–present
Instruments: drums
Release contributions: Vino, Țepeș

Cristi Gram
Active: 2004–2014, 2015–present
Instruments: lead guitar, background vocals
Release contributions: Baba Novak

Former members 
 Ioan "Pilu" Ștefanovici – drums (1962–1967, 1969–1970)
 Kamocsa Bela – bass guitar, drums (1962–1971; died 2010)
 Claudiu Rotaru – lead guitar (1962–1968)
 Florin Dumitru – drums (1968)
 Dorel Vintilă Zaharia – drums (1967–1968, 1969–1970)
 Valeriu Sepi – percussion (1971–1974)
 Günther Reininger – keyboards, backing vocals (1968–1970, 1974–1976; died 2015)
 Mircea Baniciu – lead vocals, rhythm guitar (1971–1977, 1990–1992, 1997–1998, 2001–2003, 2004–2007)
 Josef Kappl – bass guitar, backing vocals, violin, blockflöte (1971–1979, 1986–1992, 1998–1999, 2004–2008)
 Costin Petrescu – drums (1971–1975)
 Ovidiu Lipan "Țăndărică" – drums (1975–1979, 1984–1998, 2001–2012)
 Mani Neumann – violin, blockflöte, backing vocals (1979–1981, 1989–2008)
 Tom Buggie – bass guitar (1980–1981)
 Lucian Cioargă – drums (1999–2000)
 Tavi Colen – lead vocals (1999–2000)
 Alin Oprea – lead guitar, backing vocals (1999–2000)
 Andrei Cerbu – guitar (2014–2015)
 Marc Alexandru Tint – guitar (2014–2016)

Former touring musicians

 Mitu Cîmpan – piano (1962–1964)
 Doru Creșneac – lead guitar (1963–1965)
 Adi Pavlovici – lead guitar, backing vocals (1962–1963)
 Zoltan Kovacs – bass guitar (1970–1971)
 Liviu Butoi – oboe, flute (1970–1973)
 Erlend Krauser – rhythm and lead guitar, backing vocals (1976–1978)
 Cornel Liuba – drums (1970–1971, 1976–1977)
 Ștefan Bartha – bass guitar (1973)
 Eugen Gondi – drums (1975)
 Ulli Heidelberg – lead guitar, violin, backing vocals (1978–1980)
 Sabin Dumbrăveanu – cello (1980–1981)
 Bubi Dobrozemsky – cello, backing vocals 1978–1981

 Cristoph Bank – bass guitar (1978)
 Mainolf Bauschulte – drums (1979–1980)
 Dietrich "Dixie" Krauser – bass guitar, vocals (1987–1989, 1990)
 Dragoș Bădoi – lead vocals (1992–1994)
 Malcolm J. Lewis – lead vocals (2000)
 Eugen Tegu – bass guitar (2001–2002)
 Bogdan Bradu – lead vocals (2003–2004, 2007–2013)
 Ionuț Contraș – percussion, backing vocals (2005–2010)
 Cristina Kisseleff – violin (2014)
 Ionuț Micu – drums (2012–2014)
 Roxana Zanga – drums (2015–2016)
 Sergiu Corbu Boldor – violin (2014–2015)

References

Transsylvania Phoenix